
Gmina Czorsztyn is a rural gmina (administrative district) in Nowy Targ County, Lesser Poland Voivodeship, in southern Poland, on the Slovak border. It takes its name from the village of Czorsztyn, its former seat (until 1993).

Villages
Gmina Czorsztyn contains the villages and settlements of Czorsztyn, Huba, Kluszkowce, Maniowy, Mizerna, Sromowce Niżne and Sromowce Wyżne.

Neighbouring gminas
Gmina Czorsztyn is bordered by the gminas of Krościenko nad Dunajcem, Łapsze Niżne, Nowy Targ and Ochotnica Dolna. It also borders Slovakia.

References
Polish official population figures 2006

Czorsztyn
Nowy Targ County